Time, Forward! (Vremya, vperyod!) is a 1965 Soviet drama film directed by Sofiya Milkina and Mikhail Schweitzer based on a novel with the same name and a screenplay by Valentin Kataev. The film was produced by Mosfilm, a unit of the State Committee for Cinematography (Goskino). The famous musical score was composed by Georgy Sviridov.

The title is derived from Vladimir Mayakovsky's play The Bathhouse.

Plot summary
The film is set in the 1930s, depicting one day of the construction work of Magnitogorsk Iron and Steel Works (or Magnitka). The characters are construction workers and Komsomol members who are eager to work. Learning that their colleagues in Kharkov have set a record, they are mobilized in order to beat them. Everyone at the construction site has embraced socialist competition. They are ready to win at any cost to speed up construction and complete the work on time. A Moscow journalist comes to cover the scope of the great construction project, seeking a hero for his story.

Cast
 Sergei Yursky as David Margulies
 Inna Gulaya as Shura Soldatova
 Tamara Syomina as Olya Trigubova
 Leonid Kuravlyov as Korneyev
 Vladimir Kashpur as Kanunnikov
 Stanislav Khitrov as Sayenko
 Yefim Kopelyan as Nalbandov
Bruno O'Ya as Thomas Bixby
 Tatyana Lavrova as Klava
 Aleksander Yanvaryov as Ishchenko
 Mikhail Kokshenov as Kanunnikov
 Yuri Volyntsev as Writer
 Viktor Sergachyov as Semechkin
 Larisa Kadochnikova as Katya
 Igor Yasulovich as Vinkich
 Vadim Zobin as Mosya
 Viktor Markin as Reporter
 Radner Muratov as Zagirov
 Klara Rumyanova as Lushka
 Boris Yurchenko as Filonov

Theme
Sviridov's orchestral suite written for this film was one of the most recognizable music pieces of the Soviet era, and became a sort of calling card for the Soviet Union itself. Since 1986 it has been used as the theme song of Vremya, the TV news program on USSR Central Television and Russian Channel One (although the tune has been re-orchestrated a few times since then). It was also used as the opening theme for the four-part Channel 4 documentary Spitfire Ace in Great Britain.

The theme has been used in subsequent films, most notably Theodore Ushev's Tower Bawher and Guy Maddin's short film "The Heart of the World".

Olympics association
It was performed at the close of the 2010 Olympic ceremony in Vancouver, conducted live by Valery Gergiev, to present the 2014 Winter Olympics, which were held in Sochi, Russia. At the 2014 opening ceremony in Sochi, the theme was used again during a scene depicting national industrialization and the collectivization of agriculture in the Soviet Union. The dancers wore red and black costumes while they interacted with huge figurative tractors, giant ditch-diggers, gears, and similar engine parts. The Russian rhythmic gymnastics team used the Overture in their gold medal winning all-around routine at the 2016 Summer Olympics.

References

External links
 
 
 Listen to the main theme

1965 films
Soviet black-and-white films
1965 drama films
Mosfilm films
1960s Russian-language films
Films directed by Mikhail Shveytser
Orchestral suites
Films based on Russian novels
Soviet drama films
Films scored by Georgy Sviridov